Martin Barba may refer to:

 Martin Barba (tennis) (born 1966), American tennis player
 Martín Barba (born 1989), Mexican actor and singer